Aphis nerii is an aphid of the family Aphididae.  Its common names include oleander aphid, milkweed aphid, sweet pepper aphid, and nerium aphid.

Distribution
The oleander aphid is widespread in regions with tropical and Mediterranean climates.
In Poland, oleander aphid has only been reported from a glasshouse. Small populations of oleander aphid are present in gardens in London, England.

Lifecycle
Female aphids lay live young (nymphs), a process known as viviparity. Female aphids reproduce by parthenogenesis, males have never been observed in the wild but have been produced under laboratory conditions. Females may be wingless or winged (alate), the production of the alate form occurs a higher rate in those regions where it is necessary for oleander aphid to migrate each year on to temporary hosts.

Oleander aphid has a wide range of hosts, but mainly feeds on plants in the dogbane family, including milkweeds, oleander and periwinkle. It is occasionally recorded feeding on plants in the bindweed family, daisy family and spurge family as well as rarely being recorded on Citrus.

Virus Vector
Oleander aphid can act as a vector of viruses in the genus Potyvirus and Cucumovirus. The following viruses are known to be vectored by oleander aphid:

Araujia mosaic virus
Bean yellow mosaic virus
Bittergourd mosaic virus
Citrus tristeza virus
Cucumber mosaic virus
Lentil mosaic virus
Papaya ringspot virus
Tobacco etch virus
Watermelon mosaic virus
Zucchini yellow mosaic virus

Photos

References

nerii
Insects described in 1841
Taxa named by Étienne Laurent Joseph Hippolyte Boyer de Fonscolombe